Nebula-75 is a 2020 Supermarionation web series created by Century 21 Films in the spirit of the early 1960s series by Gerry Anderson's AP Films. The series follows the adventures of the crew of the spaceship Nebula-75, trapped in space "33 million miles from Earth". Commander Ray Neptune is joined by robot Circuit, scientist Doctor Asteroid and the mysterious "space maiden" Athena, who only communicates via telepathy.

The series was created by Stephen La Rivière and Andrew T. Smith and their production team during the COVID-19 pandemic in the United Kingdom - finding themselves unable to continue planned studio production work, the film-makers created the series in a flat with puppets, props and materials from earlier productions such as Filmed in Supermarionation, Thunderbirds: The Anniversary Episodes and the Endeavour episode "Apollo".

Original 1960s-era music was licensed from the Barry Gray Archive, including a 1963 song "Robot Man" by Mary Jane with Barry Gray and his Spacemakers. The authentic 1960s feel of the production was discussed by Samira Ahmed with La Rivière on BBC Radio 4's Front Row on 19 May. Ahmed later lent her voice to a news reporter character, Juliette Destiny, for the 2020 Christmas episode.

A second series of Nebula-75 commenced its run in 2021 and in December of that year it was announced that the series had been picked up for distribution by Tohokushinsha Film Corporation in Japan. The series' broadcast on Japanese television was preceded by theatrical screenings of Nebula-75'''s first episode, shown in cinemas across the country alongside three special anniversary editions of Thunderbirds'' produced for that series' 50th anniversary by members of the same production team.

As of 2022, the series is not available on YouTube due to a licensing agreement. It is currently available on Amazon Prime Video (in the USA and the UK) and on Vimeo.

Series One episodes

Series Two episodes

References

External links

 
 

British drama web series
British science fiction television shows
English-language television shows
Fictional spacecraft
Marionette films
Androids in television
Space adventure television series
British television shows featuring puppetry
Television series set in the 21st century
Television series about being lost from home